The 2020–21 Iraq Division One was the 47th season of the Iraq Division One, the second tier of the Iraqi football league system since its establishment in 1974. The number of clubs in the league have changed throughout history due to several factors, most recently in this season when the number of clubs increased from 12 to 28 in total. The top team from each group is directly promoted to the Premier League, while a third club can be promoted through play-offs, on the other hand, two clubs from each group are directly relegated to the Division Two.

Al-Sinaa won the title and were promoted alongside runners-up Newroz.

Format 
Teams from all over Iraq participated in preliminary qualifications for the final stage. Total of 16 teams qualified for the final stage and 12 teams joined from previous season.

There was no Division One nor Premier League season held the prior year due to the Coronavirus Pandemic.

Teams

Stadiums and locations 

A total of 28 teams are contesting the league, including 10 sides from the 2018-2019 season, 16 promoted teams from the preliminary qualifications for the final stage and the two relegated sides from the Premier League.

League table

Group 1

Results

Group 2

Results

Third place

Final

Play-offs

Season statistics

Top scorers

References

External links
 Iraq Football Association

Iraq Division One seasons
2020–21 in Iraqi football